Kenneth Robeson was the house name used by Street & Smith publications as the writer of their popular characters Doc Savage and later Avenger. Lester Dent wrote most of the Doc Savage stories; others credited under the Robeson name included:

 William G. Bogart
 Evelyn Coulson
 Harold A. Davis
 Lawrence Donovan
 Philip José Farmer
 Alan Hathway
 W. Ryerson Johnson
 Will Murray
 Ron Goulart

All 24 of the Avenger stories were written by Paul Ernst, using the Robeson house name.  Robeson was credited on the cover of The Avenger magazine as "the creator of Doc Savage."

References

External links
Doc Savage Organized

Fantasy shared pseudonyms
Doc Savage
House names